Hansung University is a university in Seoul, South Korea. It was founded on December 21, 1972.  The Design Campus is located in Jongno-gu, Seoul.

Timeline

1945–1989
Sep. 25, 1945 Acquired Kyungsung Girl's Art School 
Oct. 5, 1945 Founded Hansung Academy Foundation
Apr. 9, 1946 Licensed for Hansung Girl's and High School 
Aug. 11, 1951 Changed the school name to Hansung Girl's Middle and High School 
Dec. 7, 1963 Completed the indoor gymnasium 
Dec. 21, 1972 Founded Hansung Woman's University 
Jan. 11, 1978 Changed the school name from Hansung Woman's University to Hansung University 
Dec. 29, 1981 Completed the Administrative Hall 
Oct. 5, 1983 Ground breaking ceremony for Student Welfare Hall 
Dec. 4, 1985 Newly established R.O.T.C. 
July 1986 Expanded and moved the school building 
Aug. 25, 1987 Completed the construction of Woochongwan 
Nov. 30, 1987 Licensed to establish the Graduate School of Business Administration and Public Administration 
Nov. 30, 1988 Separated and increased the size of Graduate School of Business Administration and the Graduate School of Public Administration 
Nov. 6, 1989 Newly established Graduate School

1990–1999
Feb. 27, 1990 Completed the Science Hall and opened Electronic Computation Office 
Jun. 14, 1991 Opened the Exhibition Hall of Agricultural Life History 
Nov. 29, 1991 Completed the Symbolic Tower of Hansung Academy 
Dec. 1991 Recruited for first semester and second semester for 1992 
Mar. 1993 Promoted to comprehensive university 
Oct. 1993 Established Graduate School of Arts 
Oct. 1995 Established Graduate School of International Trade and Information 
Oct. 1996 6 colleges, 16 majors, 14 departments, newly admitted students of 1,230 
Nov. 1998 Newly established Real Estate Department; Newly established Fashion Art Department at Graduate School of Arts; Reorganized to 6 colleges, 16 majors, 15 departments, newly admitted students of 1,620 
Jan. 1999 Converted 30% of evening students to daytime students; Recruited for 960 day students and 660 evening students 
Mar. 6, 1999 Completed the lecture building 
Oct. 17, 1999 Helmut Schmidt, Former Prime Minister of West Germany, visited (conferring honorary degree) 
Nov. 1999 Revised Graduate School of International Trade and Information to Graduate School of International Affairs

2000–present
Feb. 7, 2000 Selected as the most outstanding college in the comprehensive assessment of colleges in 1999 
Feb. 7, 2000 Newly established Graduate School of Real Estate 
Oct. 2000 Newly established Graduate School of Education 
Sep. 13, 2001 Dr. Lee Sang-Hee inaugurated as the 10th chairman of the board of trustees 
Sep. 22, 2001 Purchased the Daehangno campus 
Oct. 24, 2001 Groundbreaking ceremony of Faculty Hall, Library and Annex Hall of Student Hall 
Oct. 15, 2002 Dr. Han Wan-Sang inaugurated as the 4th president 
Sep. 2002 Completed the Research Hall (Faculty Hall) 
Dec. 2002 Completed Inseonggwan (Student Community Unit) 
Jul. 1, 2003 Acquired the ISO 9001 Certification 
Oct. 2003 Completed New Library Building
Mar. 2 2015 Dr. Lee Jong-Hoon inaugurated as the 15th chairman of the board of trustees
Feb. 1 2016 Dr. Lee Sang-Han inaugurated as the 8th president

Academics

Undergraduate colleges

College of Humanities
 Division of Korean language & Literature (Day & Evening)
 Major in Korean Language and Literature
 Major in Applied-Korean language
 Division of English language & Literature (Day & Evening)
 Major in English Linguistics
 Major in English Literature
 Division of History and Culture (Day & Evening)
 Major in Korean History and Culture
 Major in East Asian History and Culture
 Major in Euro-American History and Culture
 Division of Knowledge & Information Science (Day & Evening)
 Major in Library & Information Science
 Major in Archives and Records Management College of Social Sciences

College of Social Science
 Division of Business Administration (Day & Evening)
Major in Business Administration
Major in Information & Management
 Division of Public Administration and Economics (Day & Evening)
Major in Public Administration
Major in Economics and Information
 Division of International Trade and Real Estate (Day & Evening)
Major in International Trade
Major in Real Estate

College of Arts
Department of Dancing
Department of Painting
Major in Eastern Painting
Major in Western Painting
 Division of Media Design Contents
Major in Hyper Media Design
Major in Animation & Product Interaction
Major in Interior Design
 Division of Fashion Design & Business (Day & Evening)
Major in Fashion Design
Major in Apparel Fashion & Business

College of Engineering
 Division of Computer Engineering (Day & Evening)
Major in Multimedia Information Processing
Major in Computer System
 Division of Information Engineering (Day & Evening)
Major in Information & Communications Engineering
Major in Software System
Division of Industrial & Mechanical Systems Engineering (Day & Evening)
Major in Industrial Engineering
Major in Mechanical Systems Engineering

Department of Liberal Arts and Science

Department of Study for the Teaching Profession

References

External links
 Hansung University
 Graduate School Hansung University
 Library Of Hansung University
 Entrance Of Hansung University

See also
List of universities and colleges in South Korea

Educational institutions established in 1945
Hansung University
1945 establishments in Korea
Seongbuk District